Lee Harrison III (1929–1998) was a pioneer in analog electronic animation. Harrison received two bachelor's degrees from Washington University in St. Louis (Bachelor of Fine Arts in 1952 and a Bachelor of Science in Mechanical Engineering in 1959). He is best known as the inventor of Scanimate and the ANIMAC. He received an Emmy Award in 1972 for his work.

Early life
Harrison was raised in Belleville, Illinois where his family were influential business leaders.  He is the grandson of Lee Harrison who invented the "Jumbo" Steam Engine. His brother Theopolis Harrison became the President of Harrison Machine Works.

Between degrees at Washington University, he served two years in the Coast Guard and worked as an artist.

Career
He was the founder, president, chairman, and chief executive officer of the former Computer Image Corporation in Denver.  He won an Emmy Award in 1972.

References

External links
Scanimate.net, dedicated to the history of early analog computer animation.
, about Lee Harrison and computer animation.

1929 births
1998 deaths
McKelvey School of Engineering alumni
Sam Fox School of Design & Visual Arts alumni
American chief executives
American company founders
People from Belleville, Illinois
Emmy Award winners
Washington University in St. Louis alumni